Tobías Bolaños International Airport  is one of four international airports in Costa Rica, and the secondary airport serving the city of San José, after Juan Santamaría International Airport. It is located in downtown San José, in Pavas District, San José Canton. The airport is named for Costa Rican pilot Tobias Bolaños Palma (1892-1953).

The airport has one runway (1566mx23m). It lies at an elevation of 1002 meters AMSL. The airport has no instrument approach procedures and can only accept VFR flights. 

This airport is the main base for general aviation in the country, as well as most private flight operations, charter flights, tourism. and aviation schools. Several companies offer charter services from this airport: Aerobell, CarmonAir, Prestige Wings,Taxiaereo among others.

Airlines and destinations

Aviation schools
There are 8 flight schools operating out of Tobías Bolaños International Airport. Some offer additional aviation courses such as cabin crew training, dispatcher training among others. They have varying fleets of single and multi-engine aircraft for Ab initio pilot training.  

AENSA - Academia de Ensenanza Aeronautica
Aerobell Flight School
Aeroformacion
Aerotica
CPEA - Centro Profesional de Enseñanza Aeronáutica
ECDEA - Escuela Costarricense de Aviacion (Part of CarmonAir and Costa Rica Green Airways)
IACA - Instituto Aeronautico Centroamericano
IFA - Instituto de Formacion Aeronautica

Passenger statistics

These data show number of passenger movements into the airport, according to the Directorate General of Civil Aviation of Costa Rica's Statistical Yearbooks.

See also
 Transport in Costa Rica
 List of airports in Costa Rica

References

External links 

Dirección General de Aviación Civil de Costa Rica Costa Rican Aviation Authority
Nature Air
Aerobell Airlines

Airports in Costa Rica
Buildings and structures in San José Province